Vidas Dančenka (born 2 August 1973) is a former Lithuanian international football player.

Club career
In the 1997–1998 season he was LFF A lyga top scorer with 26 goals.

References

External links

1973 births
People from Telšiai
Living people
Lithuanian footballers
Lithuanian expatriate footballers
Lithuania international footballers
FC Rubin Kazan players
FC Elista players
FC Lokomotiv Nizhny Novgorod players
Expatriate footballers in Russia
Russian Premier League players
FK Kareda Kaunas players
Association football forwards
JK Tervis Pärnu players